Llangernyw is a rural, mostly Welsh-speaking, village and community in Conwy County Borough, North Wales.

Overview
At the 2011 census, the community had a population of 1,079 of whom 63.7 percent were Welsh speakers. The comparable figures for the 2001 census were a population of 982, 67 per cent of whom were Welsh speakers. The population of the village itself is around 400. 

The village lies on the A548 between Llanrwst and Llanfair Talhaiarn, at the point where the Afon Cledwen, a tributary of the Afon Elwy, is crossed by the main road.

Situated on the outskirts of the village is Hafodunos Hall, a gothic mansion ravaged by fire in 2004, and currently being restored by a private owner.

The churchyard of St Digain's parish church in Llangernyw is the site of an ancient yew tree, the Llangernyw Yew, estimated to be around 4,000 years old. This is thought to be the oldest living tree in Europe (see List of longest-living organisms).

Also of note is the Sir Henry Jones Museum, which is dedicated to the life of the philosopher and academic, Henry Jones, who grew up in the village. The museum is his childhood home, a small cottage, which has been preserved internally and externally.

The community includes the villages of Gwytherin and Pandy Tudur, plus the hamlet of Pentre Isaf, and extends up to, and includes part of, Mynydd Hiraethog.

Governance
An electoral ward in the same name exists. This ward stretches to the south of Llangernyw Community and has a total population at the 2011 census of 1,435, and includes Pentrefoelas.

References

External links 

 A Vision of Britain Through Time
 British Listed Buildings
 Clwyd Churches: Gwytherin
 Clwyd Churches: Llangernyw
 Eastern Conwy Churches Survey: Gwytherin
 Eastern Conwy Churches Survey: Llangernyw
 Genuki: Gwytherin
 Genuki: Llangernyw
 Geograph
 Office for National Statistics